Friedrich Wolf may refer to:

Friedrich Wolf (writer) (1888–1953), German doctor and writer
Friedrich August Wolf (1759–1824), German philologist and critic
Friedrich Wolf (gymnast) (1880–?), German gymnast

See also
Fred Wolf (disambiguation)